In phonetics, a triphthong (from Greek τρίφθογγος, "triphthongos", literally "with three sounds," or "with three tones") is a monosyllabic vowel combination involving a quick but smooth movement of the articulator from one vowel quality to another that passes over a third. While "pure" vowels, or monophthongs, are said to have one target articulator position, diphthongs have two and triphthongs three.

Triphthongs are not to be confused with disyllabic sequences of a diphthong followed by a monophthong, as in German Feuer  'fire', where the final vowel is longer than those found in triphthongs.

Examples
For instance, the Polish word łój  'tallow' is typically analyzed as  - a sequence of a consonant followed by a vowel and another consonant. This is because the palatal approximant is resyllabified in some inflected forms, such as łojami  (instr. pl.), and also because  occurs word-finally after a consonant just like  does (compare przemysł  'industry' with Przemyśl  'Przemyśl'), which means that both of them behave more like consonants than vowels.

First segment is the nucleus

Bernese German
Bernese German has the following triphthongs:
 as in Gieu 'boy'
 as in Gfüeu 'feeling'
 as in Schueu 'school'

Danish
Danish has the following triphthongs:
 as in færge 'ferry'
 as in hvirvle 'to whirl'
 as in Børge, a given name
 as in spurv 'sparrow'

English
In British Received Pronunciation, and most other non-rhotic (r-dropping) varieties of English, monosyllabic triphthongs with R are optionally distinguished from sequences with disyllabic realizations:
 as in hour (compare with disyllabic "shower" )
 as in fire (compare with disyllabic "higher" )
 as in "loir" (compare with final disyllabic sequence in "employer" )

Other instances are loanwords, such as boa.

Second segment is the nucleus
Spanish:
 as in buey  'ox'
 as in Uruguay  'Uruguay'
 as in cambiáis  'you [informal plural] change'
 as in cambiéis  'that you [informal plural] may change'

The last two are mostly restricted to European Spanish. In Latin American Spanish (which has no distinct vosotros form), the corresponding words are cambian  and cambien , with a rising-opening diphthong followed by a nasal stop and initial, rather than final stress. In phonology,  are analyzed as a monosyllabic sequence of three vowels: .

See also
Hiatus
Index of phonetics articles
List of vowels
List of phonetics topics
Semivowel
Vowel breaking

References

Bibliography

 
 

Vowels